Bolaang Airport is an airport in Bolaang, Indonesia.

References

Airports in North Sulawesi